Sherwood Academy (formerly Sherwood E-ACT Academy, The Gedling School and Gedling Secondary Modern) was a secondary school with academy status located in the village of Gedling, Nottinghamshire, England. At its peak, it educated almost 1000 students, and at times, taught A-Levels, O-levels, GCSEs, and BTECs. In the 21st century, the school struggled with critical Ofsted reports, leading to several major changes in management. In 2016, was eventually closed due to financial insolvency.

History 
Throughout the 21st century, Gedling scored poorly in both grades and Ofsted reports, though did show some signs of improvement, and in 2007 lay just above the national average. Following an Ofsted inspection in September 2010, the school was given a Notice to Improve because of the school's lack of progress in improving weaknesses highlighted in a previous inspection. Due to the problems faced by the school, Nottinghamshire County Council announced in 2010 that it planned close the school in 2012.

In September 2012, E-ACT Academy Trust became the sponsor for the school, saving it from closure, and renamed it "Sherwood E-ACT Academy". In June 2014, it was announced that E-ACT was to be stripped of the academy by the government, and that the academy again faced the threat of closure By September 2014, the academy shut to years 7, 8 and 9 students, with only year 10 and 11 students remaining to finish their GCSEs. In April 2015, The Redhill Academy Trust took over control of the academy, renamed it "Sherwood Academy", and in September 2016, closed the school permanently.
Demolition of the site commenced in June 2019 and was completed August of the same year. The site now stands vacant.

See also
List of schools in Nottinghamshire
Department for Education

References

External links
Official website
Ofsted reports on the school
Government page on The Gedling School
Government page on Sherwood Academy
County council page on the school
Ofsted reports on the school

Defunct schools in Nottingham
Educational institutions established in 1969
Educational institutions disestablished in 2016
1969 establishments in England
2016 disestablishments in England